In mathematics, the Lévy–Prokhorov metric (sometimes known just as the Prokhorov metric) is a metric (i.e., a definition of distance) on the collection of probability measures on a given metric space. It is named after the French mathematician Paul Lévy and the Soviet mathematician Yuri Vasilyevich Prokhorov; Prokhorov introduced it in 1956 as a generalization of the earlier Lévy metric.

Definition

Let  be a metric space with its Borel sigma algebra . Let  denote the collection of all probability measures on the measurable space .

For probability measures clearly .

Properties

 If  is separable, convergence of measures in the Lévy–Prokhorov metric is equivalent to weak convergence of measures.
 The metric space  is separable if and only if  is separable.
 If  is complete then  is complete. If all the measures in  have separable support, then the converse implication also holds: if  is complete then  is complete. In particular, this is the case if  is separable.
 If  is separable and complete, a subset  is relatively compact if and only if its -closure is -compact.
 If  is separable, then , where  is the Ky Fan metric.

Relation to other distances
Let  be separable. Then
 , where  is the total variation distance of probability measures

See also

 Lévy metric
 Prokhorov's theorem
 Tightness of measures
 weak convergence of measures
 Wasserstein metric
  Radon distance
 Total variation distance of probability measures

Notes

References

 
 
 
 

Measure theory
Metric geometry
Probability theory
Paul Lévy (mathematician)